Fashionista Super Dance Troupe is the first album by the indie/art rock band Help She Can't Swim, released on Fantastic Plastic Records in 2004.

Track listing
"Fermez La Bouche" – 1:38
"I Don't Need You" – 1:51
"Bunty vs Beano" – 2:10
"My Own Private Disco" – 2:34
"Sensitive Youth" – 1:54
"What Would Morrissey Say?" – 2:13
"Yr the One" – 1:55
"Are You Feeling Fashionable?" – 2:45
"Boy Toy" – 2:04
"The Dance Party Turned Into A Wake" – 1:56
"Apples" – 3:56

The Japanese release had two bonus tracks.

Drew Barrymore Movie Marathon
Bra Burning For Kicks

Personnel 
Tom Denney – vocals, guitar, keyboard
Leesey Frances – keyboard, vocals
Tom Baker – bass guitar, keyboard
Lewis Baker – drums

References

2004 debut albums
Help She Can't Swim albums
Fantastic Plastic Records albums